Scaeosopha grandannulata is a species of moth of the family Cosmopterigidae. It is found on Borneo and Sumatra.

The wingspan is 14–14.5 mm. The ground colour of the forewings is whitish-yellow, overlaid with dark-brown spots and patches. The hindwings are yellowish-brown.

Etymology
The species name refers to the stout anellus and is derived from the Latin prefix grandi- (meaning stout) and annulatus (meaning ring shaped).

References

Moths described in 2012
Scaeosophinae